The 2007–08 Highland Football League was won by Cove Rangers while as Fort William finished bottom.

Table

Results

References

Highland Football League seasons
5
Scottish